Hyalinobatrachium ibama is a species of frog in the family Centrolenidae. It is found in the Cordillera Oriental, Santander Department, Colombia, and in Barinas, Venezuela.

Its natural habitats are old-growth forests near streams. It is threatened by habitat loss.

References

ibama
Amphibians of the Andes
Amphibians of Colombia
Amphibians of Venezuela
Amphibians described in 1998
Taxonomy articles created by Polbot
Taxa named by John Douglas Lynch